Aramotu is a 2010 Nigerian drama film directed by Niji Akanni. It stars Idiat Sobande, Kayode Odumosu and Gabriel Afolayan. It received 7 nominations at the 7th Africa Movie Academy Awards and won the awards for Best Nigerian Film and Best Costume Design.

Plot
Set in 1909, the film tells a story of a wealthy female trader, Aramotu (Idiat Sobande) in an extremely culture-conscious yoruba community. She tries to use the congenial qualities of the Gelede Cult in getting ideas on women's rights and establishing a government centered on the needs of the people. She formed a clan that includes a singer (Gabriel Afolayan) which eventually breaks up her marriage with her kindhearted husband (Kayode Odumosu). This new relationship threatens to kill everything she has built and affects her relationship with other community leaders negatively.

Cast
Idiat Sobande
Kayode Odumosu
Ireti Osayemi-Bakare
Ayo Olabiyi
Gabriel Afolayan
Tunbosun Odunsi
Peter Fatomilola
Bisi Komolafe

Release
It was released on 20 February 2011 at Coral Reef, Ikoya Avenue ikoyi, Lagos State. The film has been screened at several festivals around the world, including 2nd Africa International Film Festival, Lagos, Nigeria (2011), Samsung Women's International Film Festival, Chennai, India (2012), Africa In The Picture Film Festival, Amsterdam (2012), Arusha African International Film Festival, Tanzania (2013) and International Film Festival of Kerala, India (2013)

It has also featured as showcase film at academic forums on contemporary African Cinema at the 3rd Ife International Film Festival, Obafemi Awolowo University, Ile-Ife, Nigeria (2012), and at the Tamar Golan Africa Centre, Ben-Gurion University of the Negev, Beer Sheva, Israel (2017)

Accolades

References

Best Nigerian Film Africa Movie Academy Award winners
Films set in 1909
Nigerian drama films
2010 drama films
2010 films
Yoruba-language films